Prusinowo may refer to the following places:
Prusinowo, Czarnków-Trzcianka County in Greater Poland Voivodeship (west-central Poland)
Prusinowo, Poznań County in Greater Poland Voivodeship (west-central Poland)
Prusinowo, Pomeranian Voivodeship (north Poland)
Prusinowo, Działdowo County in Warmian-Masurian Voivodeship (north Poland)
Prusinowo, Mrągowo County in Warmian-Masurian Voivodeship (north Poland)
Prusinowo, Gryfice County in West Pomeranian Voivodeship (north-west Poland)
Prusinowo, Łobez County in West Pomeranian Voivodeship (north-west Poland)